Victoria Ward, Ward of Victoria, or variation, may refer to:

Places
 Victoria Ward (Ottawa), the civic ward of Victoria in the city of Ottawa, Ontario, Canada
 Victoria (Hackney ward), a civic ward in the London Borough of Hackney, Merseyside, England, UK
 Victoria (Sefton ward), a civic ward in the Metropolitan Borough of Sefton, England, UK
 Victoria, a ward of Newbury, Berkshire, England, UK
 Victoria, London, England, UK; a former ward of the Westminster Metropolitan Borough
 Borough of Victoria, Lower North Shore, Sydney, New South Wales, Australia; formerly the Ward of Victoria

People
 Victoria Ward (actress) (1939–1992), British actress
 Vicky Ward (born 1969, as Victoria Penelope Jane Ward), British-American journalist
 Vicki Ward (born 1969), Australian politician of Victoria state
 Victoria Ward (20th century), the namesake of the shopping center Ward Centers

Other uses
 Ward Centers, formerly Victoria Ward Centers, a shopping center at Kaka'ako, Honolulu, Hawai'i, USA
 Victoria Ward Limited, the operating company for Ward Centers
 Victoria Ward, Balmain Hospital Main Building, Balmain, Inner West Council, Sydney, New South Wales, Australia; a hospital ward in a listed building

See also
 Victor Ward (1923–2011), Canadian miner
 Victoria (disambiguation)
 Ward (disambiguation)